Jacques Baudry de Lamarche (baptized 13 September 1676 – ca. 1738) was the son of a Canadian craftsman from Trois-Rivières who moved to France at some point in his youth.

There is little information about Jacques Baudry de Lamarche. He returned to North America about 1723 and acquired the rights to certain properties in Detroit. These were in the name of Antoine Laumet de La Mothe, sieur de Cadillac and consisted of several buildings and various other land. An attorney, Étienne Véron de Grandmesnil, from Trois-Rivières took the appointment to carry out the legalities of this extensive acquisition. Opposing major aspects of the transaction were Philippe de Rigaud Vaudreuil and Alphonse de Tonty.

In 1738, Baudry's name appears in New France in connection with a position as general and special attorney for the Frères Hospitaliers de la Croix, a charitable order in Montreal.

References

External links

People of New France
1676 births
1730s deaths